Željko, sometimes written Zeljko, is a South Slavic masculine given name.

In Croatia, the name Željko was among the most common masculine given names in the decades between 1950 and 1979, and was the most common name in the 1960s.

Notable people with the name include:

Željko Adžić (born 1965), Croatian footballer
Zeljko Babic (born 1976), Australian association football player
Željko Bebek (born 1945), Bosnian singer, lead vocalist of Bijelo dugme from 1974 to 1984
Željko Bilecki (born 1950), Canadian soccer player
Željko Blagojević, Bosnian Serb long-distance runner
Željko Božić (born 1974), Serbian stuntman and actor
Željko Bogut (born 1969), Bosnian chess player and two time national champion
Željko Brkić (born 1986), Serbian football goalkeeper
Željko Čajkovski (1925–2016), Croatian football (soccer) player and coach
Željko Cicović (born 1971), Serbian football goalkeeper
Željko Đokić (born 1982), Serbian footballer
Željko Đurđić (born 1961), Serbian handball goalkeeper
Željko Filipović (born 1988), Slovenian footballer
Željko Franulović (born 1947), Croatian tennis player
Željko Gavrilović (born 1971), Serbian footballer
Željko Ivanek (born 1957), American actor of Slovenian-Croatian origin
Željko Ivanković (born 1954), Croatian writer from Bosnia and Herzegovina
Željko Janjetović, Bosnian diplomat, Ambassador Extraordinary and Plenipotentiary of Bosnia and Herzegovina to the Russian Federation
Željko Joksimović (born 1972), popular Serbian singer, composer, songwriter and producer
Željko Jovanović (disambiguation), multiple people
Željko Kalac (born 1972), Australian goalkeeper currently playing for Greek club Kavala
Željko Kalajdžić (born 1978), Serbian professional football midfielder
Željko Kerum (born 1960), Croatian entrepreneur and politician
Željko Komšić (born 1964), Bosnian-Herzegovinian politician
Željko Kopanja (1954–2016), Bosnian Serb newspaper editor and director of Nezavisne Novine
Željko Kopić (born 1977), Croatian football coach
Željko Kovačević (born 1981), Serbian footballer
Željko Krajan (born 1979), Croatian tennis player and coach
Željko Kuzmić (born 1984), Serbian football goalkeeper
Željko Lelek (born 1962), Bosnian Serb indicted for mass rape crimes in Višegrad during the Bosnian War
Željko Loparić (born 1939), Croatian philosopher, historian of the philosophy and university teacher
Željko Ljubenović (born 1981), Serbian football midfielder
 (born 1948), Croatian cartoonist, animator and illustrator
Željko Malnar (1944–2013), writer and TV presenter
Željko Marasović, Croatian American composer of classical and film music
Željko Matuš (born 1935), Croatian footballer
Željko Mavrović (born 1969), Croatian boxer and entrepreneur
Željko Mijač (born 1954), Croatian football player and manager
Željko Milinovič (born 1969), Slovenian footballer
Željko Milošević (born 1976), Serbian footballer
Željko Mitrakovič (born 1972), Slovenian football midfielder
Željko Mrvaljević (born 1981), Montenegrin football defenderer
Željko Nimš (born 1950), Croatian handball player
Željko Obradović (born 1960), Serbian basketball player and coach
Željko Pahek (born 1954), Croatian and Serbian comics creator and illustrator
Željko Pavlović (born 1971), Croatian football goalkeeper
Željko Perušić (1936–2017), Croatian footballer
Željko Pervan (born 1962), Croatian comedian
Željko Petrović (born 1965), Montenegro footballer and technical coach
Željko Polak (born 1976), Bosnian Serb football player
Zeljko Radovic (Austrian footballer) (born 1974), Austrian football player
Zeljko Ranogajec (born 1961), professional gambler from Australia
Željko Ražnatović (1952–2000), better known as Arkan, Serbian career criminal and later a paramilitary leader
Željko Rebrača (born 1972), Serbian basketball player
Željko Rohatinski (1951–2019), current Governor of the Croatian National Bank
Željko Samardžić (born 1955), Bosnian Serb pop-folk singer
Željko Senečić (1933–2018), Croatian film and television production designer, film director and screenwriter
Željko Sošić (born 1980), Montenegrin director
Željko Sopić (born 1974), Croatian football midfielder
Željko Stinčić (born 1950), Croatian footballer
Željko Šašić (born 1969), Serbian pop-folk singer
Željko Šturanović (born 1960), Montenegro politician
Željko Tadić (born 1974), Montenegrin footballer
Željko Tanasković (born 1967), Serbian volleyball player
Željko Turk (born 1962), Croatian politician
Željko Vincek (born 1986), Croatian sprinter who specializes in the 400 metres
Željko Vuković (footballer, born 1962), Croatian-born Austrian footballer
Željko Vuković (footballer, born 1963), Montenegrin footballer
Željko Zagorac (born 1981), professional basketball player

See also 
 Željka
 Želimir

References

Slavic masculine given names
Bulgarian masculine given names
Croatian masculine given names
Macedonian masculine given names

Serbian masculine given names
Slovene masculine given names